The head of Regent's Park College, a permanent private hall of the University of Oxford is called the principal. This list also includes the heads of the predecessor institutions of the college, Baptist College, Stepney and Regent's Park College, London.

Principals of Baptist College, Stepney
1810–1826 William Newman
1826–1827 Solomon Young
1827–43 William Harris Murch
1843–47 Benjamin Davies
1847–49 William D. Jones
1849–1856 Joseph Angus

Principals of Regent's Park College, London
1856–1893 Joseph Angus
1896–1920 George Pearce Gould
1920–1927 H. Wheeler Robinson

Principals of Regent's Park College, Oxford
1927–1942 H. Wheeler Robinson
1942–1958 Robert Child
1958–1972 Gwynne Henton Davies
1972–1989 Barrington (Barrie) Raymond White
1989–2007 Paul Fiddes
2007–2021 Robert Ellis
From 2023 Sir Malcolm Evans, KCMG, OBE, FLSW

References

 
Regent's Park Principals
Regent's Park